Joseph Foster Malone (December 30, 1887 – February 14, 1926) was a Canadian professional ice hockey player. He played with the Toronto Blueshirts and the Montreal Canadiens of the National Hockey Association.

He was a brother of Sarsfield Malone, and a second cousin of Joe and Jeff Malone.

References

1887 births
1926 deaths
Anglophone Quebec people
Canadian ice hockey centres
Ice hockey people from Quebec
Montreal Canadiens (NHA) players
Sportspeople from Trois-Rivières
Toronto Blueshirts players